Zombiepura,  is a 2018 Singaporean horror comedy film directed by Jacen Tan. The film stars Alaric Tay and Benjamin Heng. The film was the first widely released Singaporean zombie film.

Plot
In a remote army camp, soldiers start collapsing and rising as zombies. Lazy reservist Tan Kayu and the tough Sergeant Lee Siao On have to put aside their differences in order to survive. They are joined by a woman and her daughter, who sold military supplies in the camp.

Cast
 Alaric Tay as Tan Kayu
 Benjamin Heng as Lee Siao On
 Joey Pink Lai
 Chen Xiuhuan
 Richard Low as Mad Dog Lee
 Haresh Tilani

Release
The film premiered at the 2018 Scream Asia Film Festival on October 19. The film was released in theatres on 25 October 2018.

Reception
Chen Yunhong of Lianhe Zaobao gave the film three stars out of five for entertainment and one star out of five for art. John Lui of The Straits Times gave the film 2.5 stars out of 5 in his review of the film, stating, "When the puzzle pieces shown in the first act come together neatly in the second, there is a tremendous sense of satisfaction. However, the third act comes and all the hard work unravels." Douglas Tseng of today also gave the film 2.5 stars out of 5 in his review of the film, stating, "Sometimes, the action is more perspiration than inspiration, while pacing is an issue. At 83 minutes (shorter if you omit the end-credits), it still feels a tad sluggish."

References

External links
 

2018 films
2018 comedy horror films
Singaporean comedy horror films
English-language Singaporean films
Singaporean zombie films